In mathematics, the Sherman–Takeda theorem states that if A is a C*-algebra then its double dual is a W*-algebra, and is isomorphic to the weak closure of A in the universal representation of A. 

The double dual of A is called the universal enveloping W*-algebra of A.

References

Banach algebras
C*-algebras
Functional analysis
Operator theory
Von Neumann algebras